Hîncești is a city and municipality in Moldova.

Since 2003 it has been the seat of Hîncești District.

History

Hîncești was established in 1500 AD as Dobreni.
 Within the Russian Empire it was known under the Russified name Gincheshty (Гинчешты), but in Romanian Hîncești.  In 1940 the name was changed to Kotovskoe after Grigore Kotovski, who was born there.  But from 1941 to 1944 it was again known as Hîncești.  
Before WWII, the Jewish community was rather large, in 1930, there were 1,523 Jews living there. In July 1941, Romanian gendarmes murdered more than 100 Jews in a mass execution perpetrated in a trench outside the town.

From 1945 to 1965 it was called Kotovskoe, which in 1965 was changed to Kotovsk.  Since 1990 it is again called Hîncești.

Demographics
In 1890, Hîncești had a stable population of 3,098 citizens. By 1970, the population had increased to 14.3 thousand, and by 1991, 19.3 thousand. At the 2006 census, it had 19.5 thousand permanent residents.

Education
There are four Lyceum (junior colleges) in Hîncești:
 Mihai Viteazul Lyceum
 M. Lomonosov Lyceum
 Mihai Sadoveanu Lyceum
 M. Eminescu Lyceum
 Timotei Batrinu Scoala de Arte

Notable citizens
 Grigory Ivanovich Kotowski (1881–1925), Soviet military leader and Communist activist.
 Manuc Bei, Very wealthy Armenian merchant

International relations

Twin towns – Sister cities
Hîncești is twinned with:
  Ploiești, Romania
  Or Akiva, Israel

Notes

Cities and towns in Moldova
Municipalities of Moldova
Populated places established in 1500
1500 establishments in Europe
16th-century establishments in Moldavia
Kishinyovsky Uyezd
Lăpușna County (Romania)
Ținutul Nistru
Hîncești District